Gadchiroli–Chimur Lok Sabha constituency is one of the 48 Lok Sabha (parliamentary) constituencies of Maharashtra state in western India. This constituency came into existence on 19 February 2008 as a part of the implementation of the Presidential notification on delimitation of parliamentary constituencies based on the recommendations of the Delimitation Commission of India constituted on 12 July 2002. This seat is reserved for Scheduled Tribes. It first held elections in 2009 and its first member of parliament (MP) was Marotrao Kowase of the Indian National Congress. As of the 2014 elections, it is represented by Ashok Nete of the Bharatiya Janata Party.

Assembly segments
As of 2014, Gadchiroli–Chimur Lok Sabha constituency comprises six Vidhan Sabha (legislative assembly) segments. These segments are:

Armori and Chimur assembly segments were earlier in part of the former Chimur constituency, while Gadchiroli assembly segment was earlier in the former Chandrapur constituency.

Members of Parliament

Election results

General elections 2019

General elections 2014

General elections 2009

See also
 Chimur Lok Sabha constituency ( 1967 to 2004 elections for 4th to 14th Lok Sabha )
 Chandrapur Lok Sabha constituency
 Gadchiroli district
 Chandrapur district
 Gondiya district
 List of Constituencies of the Lok Sabha

Notes

External links
Gadchiroli Chimur lok sabha  constituency election 2019 results details

Lok Sabha constituencies in Maharashtra
Lok Sabha constituencies in Maharashtra created in 2008
Gadchiroli district
Chandrapur district
Gondia district